Urucará is a municipality in the Brazilian state of Amazonas. Its population was 16,130 (2020) and its area is 27,905 km2.

The municipality contains part of the  Uatumã Biological Reserve, a strictly protected conservation unit created in 2002.

References

Municipalities in Amazonas (Brazilian state)

it:Manaus